Chief warrant officer is a senior warrant officer rank, used in many countries.

Canadian Armed Forces 
In the Canadian Armed Forces, a chief warrant officer or CWO is the most senior non-commissioned member (NCM) rank for army and air force personnel. Its equivalent rank for navy personnel is chief petty officer 1st class (CPO1).

A CWO is senior to the rank of master warrant officer (MWO) and its navy equivalent of chief petty officer 2nd class (CPO2).

Cadets Canada uses the ranks of chief petty officer 1st class (Royal Canadian Sea Cadets), chief warrant officer (Royal Canadian Army Cadets), and warrant officer 1st class (Royal Canadian Air Cadets).  This organization's uniforms use a similar coat of arms insignia as the Canadian Armed Forces.

Insignia
The rank insignia of the CWO is a simplified version of the 1957 coat of arms of Canada, worn on both forearms of the service dress tunic; in gold metal and green enamel miniature pins on the collar of the service dress shirt and outerwear coats (army only); on CADPAT ranks worn in the middle of the chest, embroidered in tan (army) or blue (air force) thread; and in pearl-grey thread on blue slip-ons on both shoulders of other uniforms (air force only).

The insignia lacks the annulus, from 1985 changes, behind the shield bearing the motto of the Order of Canada. It also differs from both the 1957 and 1985 versions through a lack of compartment and mantling.

Forms of address
CWOs are generally initially addressed as "Chief Warrant Officer", and thereafter as "Sir" or "Ma'am" by subordinates; and as Mr. or Ms. by commissioned officers. If they hold the appointment of regimental sergeant-major, they may also be addressed as "RSM" by the commanding officer, other officers, or when referred to in conversation. CWOs are never addressed as "Chief", this being a form of address reserved for chief petty officers.  Civilians can address them as Chief Warrant Officer or CWO or Mr/Mrs/Miss/Ms (followed by surname).

Key positions
CWO/CPO1 may fulfill roles in a number of key positions (KP). These positions require the incumbent to act in an advisory or liaison role to a non-command position i.e. Assistant Judge Advocate General Liaison Chief Petty Officer, RCEME Corps Sergeant-Major, Defence Ethics Program Chief Warrant Officer.

Appointments
CWOs may hold a number of appointments, some of which are:
 Regimental sergeant-major (RSM) the most senior NCO in a battalion-sized army unit, including armoured, combat engineer, and signal regiments.
 Squadron warrant officer (SWO) the most senior NCO in a squadron-sized air force units and army signal units
 School chief warrant officers/chief petty officers (SCWO/SCPO) the most senior NCO in air force, navy and some army schools of battalion or squadron size.
 Base or wing chief warrant officer/chief petty officer the most senior NCO on a Canadian Forces base or wing establishment
 Fleet chief petty officer the most senior NCO in either Atlantic Fleet, Pacific Fleet, or Naval Reserve
 Ship's coxswain the most senior NCO on a Royal Canadian Navy ship (fulfilled by a chief petty officer 2nd class or petty officer 1st class for smaller vessels)

Due to the unified nature of the Canadian Armed Forces, it is not unheard-of for air force CWOs or even navy CPO1s especially those of the so-called "purple trades", such as logistics or military police to find themselves filling the appointment of RSM in what are otherwise considered Canadian Army units (such as service battalions or communication regiments). Conversely, it is not impossible for an army CWO or navy CPO1 to be the squadron CWO of a Royal Canadian Air Force squadron.

Senior appointments
Senior appointments for chief warrant officers and chief petty officers 1st class entitle the incumbents to wear a modified rank badge or an addition to the rank badge.  They are as follows:

Formation chief warrant officer
The coat of arms over the central insignia of the badge of the Canadian Armed Forces (crossed swords, an anchor and an eagle in flight). This appointment is given to CWO assigned to commanders at the base, brigade, wing, and division levels.  Specific examples include base chief warrant officer, brigade sergeants-major, wing chief warrant officers, the division chief warrant officer (DCWO) of 1 Canadian Air Division and the division sergeant-major (Div SM) of 3rd Canadian Division (3 Cdn Div).  A formation chief warrant officer would typically be seen with a colonel or brigadier-general, but may occasionally be seen with a lieutenant-colonel or major-general.

Command chief warrant officer/chief petty officer (CCWO/CCPO)
The coat of arms with a wreath of laurel wrapped around the base. This appointment is given to CWO/CPO1 assigned to commanders of commands including to the commander Canadian Special Operations Forces Command, commander Canadian Forces Intelligence Command and commander Canadian Joint Operations Command.  The command chief warrant officer appointed to the commander Canadian Army is called the Canadian Army sergeant-major, while the command chief warrant officer appointed to commander RCAF is known as Chief Warrant Officer of the Air Force. The command chief warrant officer of the RCN is known as the RCN Command Chief Petty Officer.  A command chief warrant officer/chief petty officer would be seen with a major-general/rear-admiral or lieutenant-general/vice-admiral.

Canadian Forces chief warrant officer (CFCWO)

Messes and quarters
CWOs generally mess and billet with other warrant officers and with sergeants, and their navy equivalents, chief petty officers and petty officers. Their mess on military bases or installations are generally named the "Warrant Officers and Sergeants Mess".

Uniforms
Although NCMs, CWOs generally wear the uniform accoutrements of commissioned officers; for example, officer cap badge, waistcoat instead of cummerbund with mess dress, etc.

Cadets Canada

Israel Defense Forces

Rav nagad
insignia
IDF

The רב-נגד Rav nagad, a Chief Warrant Officer  is the most senior non-commissioned officers rank in the Israel Defense Forces (IDF). Because the IDF is an integrated force, they have a unique rank structure. IDF ranks are the same in all services (army, navy, air force, etc.). The ranks are derived from those of the paramilitary Haganah developed in the British Mandate of Palestine period to protect the Yishuv. This origin is reflected in the slightly-compacted IDF rank structure.

South African Armed Forces 

In 2008 the Warrant Officer ranks of the South African National Defence Force were expanded and the rank of Chief Warrant Officer was created.
In the South African Navy a Chief Warrant Officer is the senior NCO in Fleet Command. In the South African Army the equivalent is the senior NCO in an Army Formation, such as Armour, Infantry etc.

United States Armed Forces

Chief warrant officer in the United States Armed Forces refers to any warrant officer in pay grades CW2 and above. All warrant officers (WO1 to CWO5) are officers and rate a salute by all enlisted NATO other ranks personnel. The U.S. Army and the U.S. Marine Corps use WO1/WO through CW5/CWO5 as designators and the U.S. Navy uses WO1 for one specialty (cyber warfare); all other branches of the U.S. Armed Forces use CWO2 through CWO5. The U.S. Air Force, although authorized to appoint warrant officers, does not utilize those grades in any capacity.  All warrant officers dine in the officers' mess but rate just below O-1 (NATO rank code OF-1).

On 4 June 2018, the Chief of Naval Operations announced the reestablishment of the rank of warrant officer one (pay grade W-1), for cyber warrant officers, and solicited applications for the rank/grade. These warrant officers will receive their appointment via warrant and not via commission. They will incur a six-year service obligation once promoted to W-1. A minimum of three-years in grade with a total service time of 12 years must be achieved before appointment and commission to chief warrant officer (W-2). However, the President also may grant appointments of warrant officers in the grade of W-1 via commission at any time as well as the Secretary of the Navy may also appoint warrant officers in that grade via commission, through additional regulations. In mid-December 2018, the Navy announced that six selectees had been named. They will wear a distinctive cap badge with two crossed anchors.

Warrant officer rank insignia is the only officers' insignia that is not the same for all branches of the U.S. military, with one exception. The rank insignia for a CW5 became the only universal insignia within the warrant officer ranks when the U.S. Navy promoted its first CWO5 in 2002 and the Army adopted the emblem in 2004.

Warrant officers in the United States are classified as officers and are in the "W" category (NATO "WO"); they are technical leaders and specialists. Chief warrant officers are commissioned by the president of the United States and take the same oath as regular commissioned officers do. They may be technical experts with a long service as enlisted personnel or direct entrants, most notably as U.S. Army helicopter pilots.

Notable Warrant Officers
 Brigadier General Chuck Yeager, USAF was initially a flight officer (also known as "warrant officer (air)", in the USAAF during World War II
 MAJ (was CW3) Frederick Edgar Ferguson, USA (Medal of Honor recipient)
 MAJ (was WO1) Hugh Thompson, Jr., USA (Soldier's Medal recipient)
 CW5 David F. Cooper, USA
 CW4 Michael J. Novosel, USA (Medal of Honor recipient)
 CW4 Oscar G. Johnson, USA
 CW4 Michael Durant, USA
 CW4 Thomas J. Hennen, USA
 CW4 Keith Yoakum, USA
 CW3 Ronald D. Young Jr., USA 
 CW2 Jason W. Myers, USA
 CW2 Louis R. Rocco, USA 
 WO1 Robert Mason, USA
 CWO2/Chief Carpenter John Arnold Austin, USN
 WO1 John W. Lang, USN
 WO1 Floyd Bennett, USN (Medal of Honor recipient)
 CWO4 Hershel W. Williams, USMC (Medal of Honor recipient)
 CWO4 John W. Frederick, Jr., USMC
 CWO4 Henry Wildfang, USMC (Gray Eagle Award recipient for longest-serving naval aviator; only chief warrant officer in the history of U.S. Naval Aviation so honored)
 CWO5 Ralph E. Rigby, USA, last continuously serving draftee on active duty in the U.S. Army, retiring in 2014

See also
 Chief Petty Officer 1st Class
 Chief web officer
 Commission (document)
 Israel Defense Forces
 Israel Defense Forces insignia
 Non-commissioned member
 Regimental Sergeant-Major
 Singapore Armed Forces ranks
 List of comparative military ranks

References

External links
 thenavycwo.com

Military ranks of Canada

Military ranks of Singapore
Warrant officers